Mohamed Ahmed Ali (born 7 September 1993) is a Danish singer of mixed Egyptian and Iraqi origin.

Mohamed Ali also known by the mononym Mohamed was born in Nørresundby, Aalborg. In 2009, he took part in Season 2 of The X Factor, coming third after winner Linda Andrews and runners up Alien Beat Club. After the series, he signed a contract with Sony Music. On the occasion, Karina Foss Fenn of Sony Music Entertainment Denmark was quoted as saying: "It is rare that we in the music industry encounter a natural talent like Mohamed Ali. Both in his vocals and his physique, he oozes musicality – and his voice has both power and a sweetness that makes his rhythm quite unique." The music will no doubt to reflect Mohamed's personality". This contract resulted in a debut album Keep It Simple of 12 original songs and his single "Rocket" became one of the best downloaded songs.

Beginnings
Mohamed Ali was born in Denmark to an Egyptian father and Iraqi mother. He started early through an appearance in "Scenen er din" (translated as "the stage is yours), in 2007. His parents had been divorced one year earlier in 2006. He lived with his mother Ahlam and three older sisters Fatima, Meriam and Asia.

X Factor
He applied for the Danish version of The X Factor singing competition in 2009 where he reached the Final 3 and was a clear favorite to win. He sang the following songs:

In the finals, he got fewest SMS votes in a closely run race in which he lagged by just 2% of the votes to the runner-up in Top 3 and was able to amass big number of fans through his Facebook site (more than 70,000 friends).

After X Factor
In May 2009, he appeared as an opening act for Beyoncé when she sang in Denmark.

Having signed a contract with Sony Music, he had a debut hit with "Rocket" a song that entered the Danish Singles Chart in week 10/2009. The single peaked at No. 12 in the charts and spent a total of 20 weeks on the Danish charts.

He had a comeback through a release on disco:wax record label and distribution by Sony with the song "Den du er".

In 2010, he recorded with Swedish singer Ola Svensson and Norwegian singer Endre Nordvik the song "Fire" for the Scandinavian Nordic version of the film Camp Rock 2. The song appeared on the soundtrack album Camp Rock 2: The Final Jam

Dansk Melodi Grand Prix

In 2013, he came back to take part in Dansk Melodi Grand Prix in a bid to represent Denmark in Eurovision Song Contest 2013 with the song "Unbreakable" written by Morten Friis, Michael Parsberg, Peter Bjørnskov, Lene Dissing. He was one of ten contestants to take part and qualified for the final 3 alongside Simone with "Stay Awake" and Emmelie de Forest with "Only Teardrops". Mohamed Ali finished second overall with de Forest winning the bid to sing the Danish entry to Eurovision 2013. Despite his failure to win the contest, "Unbreakable" proved popular and was released as a single and is only his second charted single after "Rocket".

The Superfinal

Discography

Albums

Singles

Other (non-charting)
2009: "Holla!"
2010: "Fire" (with Ola and Endre Nordvik)
2012: "Ser dig"

Collaboration
2009: "All About Love" by Anna David feat. Mohamed Ali

References

External links
Mohamed Ali official site
Mohamed Ali fansite

1993 births
Living people
21st-century Danish male singers
Danish people of Egyptian descent
Danish people of Iraqi descent
X Factor (Danish TV series) contestants
People from Nørresundby